The Lupo class is a class of frigates built by Cantieri Navali Riuniti (CNR) for the Italian Navy. Designed as multipurpose warships with an emphasis on anti-surface warfare (ASuW), they have enjoyed some success in the export market, being acquired by the navies of Peru and Venezuela. A small run of a slightly updated version is known as the Soldati class.

Design
In the early 1970s, the Italian Navy faced an increased Soviet naval presence in the Mediterranean Sea which constituted a threat to its sea lines of communication as well as to its extensive coastline. To parry this menace, Italy started a naval expansion program which included frigates focused on ASuW (Lupo class) and on ASW.

For the first part of the requirement, CNR presented a design for a 2,500-ton frigate with a high speed and a heavy weapons load. The ship employed a CODOG propulsion plant to achieve 35 knots, making it one of the fastest warships at the time. Armament included 8 SSMs, 8 SAMs, several gun systems, 2 triple torpedo tubes and an ASW helicopter, which was equivalent to that carried by larger warships. Lupo-class frigates have a crew of around 200.

Italian Navy 
The Italian Navy commissioned four Lupo-class frigates between 1977 and 1980. These ships were deployed to the Persian Gulf first as escorts for tankers during the last stages of the Iran–Iraq War (1987–1988) and then as part of the Coalition forces during the 1990–1991 Gulf War. After these operations, the whole class underwent modernization which included fitting an SPS-702 CORA surface search radar and SATCOM equipment. After two decades in service, the four Italian Lupo-class frigates were decommissioned and sold to Peru in the early 2000s.

In 1996 four new Lupo-class frigates which had been built for Iraq in 1985–87, were incorporated into the Italian Navy as the Artigliere class. These ships feature a telescopic hangar; they were refitted as patrol ships and changes made for Italian service included the removal of all ASW equipment.

Ships

Soldati-class patrol frigate 

Iraq ordered four Lupo-class frigates from CNR in 1980 as part of a naval expansion program just before the Iran–Iraq War. These ships, which feature a telescopic hangar were completed between 1985 and 1987. Due to restrictions on arm sales to Iraq because of the Iran-Iraq War placed by the Italian prime minister Bettino Craxi, the ships remained interned in Italy until the end of that war in 1988. Iraqi President Saddam Hussein then tried to renegotiate the price of these ships (and the other ships purchased from Italy), claiming he should receive a discount due to the delay in delivery of the ships. Negotiations and court proceedings were still ongoing when Iraq invaded Kuwait in 1990 and a new arms embargo against Iraq was placed by the United Nations, again blocking the sale. In 1993 all of them were seized and, after being refitted as patrol ships, incorporated to the Italian Navy as the Soldati class in 1996. Changes made for Italian service included the removal of all ASW equipment. The Philippines considered acquiring the Soldati class in 2012.

 
{| class="wikitable" border="1"
|-
!colspan="11" style="background:#ffdead;" |  Soldati class
|-
! Pennantnumber
! Ship
! Builder
! Hullnumber
! Laid down
! Launched
! Commissioned
! Decommissioned
! Motto
|-
|align="center"|F 582
| (ex-Hittin)
|rowspan=2|Fincantieri, Ancona
|align="center"|903
|align="center"|31 March 1982
|align="center"|27 July 1983
|align="center"|28 October 1994
|align="center"|13 December 2013
|align="center"|Primi Velitum
|-
|align="center"|F 583
| (ex-Thi Qar)
|align="center"|904
|align="center"|3 September 1982
|align="center"|19 December 1984
|align="center"|4 January 1995
|align="center"|2 October 2019
|align="center"|Virtute Siderum Tenus
|-
|align="center"|F 584
| (ex-Al Yarmouk)
|align="center"|Fincantieri, Riva Trigoso
|align="center"|905
|align="center"|12 March 1984
|align="center"|18 April 1985
|align="center"|8 November 1995
|align="center"|17 April 2018
|align="center"|Pro Patria'
|-
|align="center"|F 585
| (ex-Al Qadisiya)
|align="center"|Fincantieri, Ancona
|align="center"|906
|align="center"|1 December 1983
|align="center"|1 June 1985
|align="center"|20 March 1996
|align="center"|30 September 2015
|align="center"|A me le guardie|}

 Peruvian Navy 

Peru became involved early in the Lupo-class frigate program, ordering four ships in 1973. The Peruvian ships were built to a modified design which included different radars, Aspide instead of Sea Sparrow SAMs, and a fixed instead of a telescopic hangar. The first two were built by CNR at its shipyard in Riva Trigoso, Genoa, and commissioned in 1979.

Construction work for the second pair was carried out under license by SIMA (Servicio Industrial de la Marina, Navy Industrial Service) at Callao, with the ships commissioning in 1984 and 1987.

In 2013, Carvajal was transferred to the Peruvian Coast Guard and renamed Guardiamarina San Martin.

Ships

 Venezuelan Navy 

Venezuela ordered six Lupo-class frigates from CNR in 1975 as a replacement for older warships. These units were commissioned between 1980 and 1982. In general terms, their appearance and equipment is similar to those built for Peru, except for some differences in electronics and missiles. Modifications of these two ships included:

 Fitting of Elbit NTCS 2000 combat management system
 Fitting of Elta EL/M-2238 Single Face STAR 3D air/surface radar
 Fitting of Northrop Grumman 21 HS-7 hull sonar
 Fitting of Elisra NS-9003 ESM system
 Fitting of Elisra NS-9005 ECM system
 Replacement of 2 GMT A230-20M diesel engines with 2 MTU 20V 1163.

The other ships in Venezuelan service were expected to undergo an austere version of this upgrade, but three ships were eventually taken out of service.

Ships

See also
 List of naval ship classes in service

References

Sources
 Faulkner, Keith, Jane's Warship Recognition Guide. 2nd edition. Jane's Information Group, 1999.
  Rodríguez, John, "Las fragatas Lupo: una breve mirada retrospectiva y perspectivas". Revista de Marina'', Year 95, No. 3: 8–32 (July / December 2002).

External links

 GlobalSecurity.org
 Naval-Technology.com

  
Frigate classes
Ships built by Fincantieri
Ships built in Italy
Frigates of the Italian Navy